Browns Branch is a  long 3rd order tributary to the Murderkill River in Kent County, Delaware.

Variant names
According to the Geographic Names Information System, it has also been known historically as:  
Spring Branch

Course
Browns Branch rises on the Nanticoke River divide about 1 mile south of Harrington, Delaware.  Browns Branch then flows northeasterly to meet the Murderkill River about 1 mile south-southwest of Frederica, Delaware.

Watershed
Browns Branch drains  of area, receives about 45.4 in/year of precipitation, has a topographic wetness index of 648.58 and is about 10.4% forested.

See also
List of Delaware rivers

Maps

References

Rivers of Delaware
Rivers of Kent County, Delaware
Tributaries of the Murderkill River